Marcel Vogel (born 9 March 1937) is a Swiss biathlete. He competed in the 20 km individual event at the 1964 Winter Olympics.

References

External links
 

1937 births
Living people
Swiss male biathletes
Olympic biathletes of Switzerland
Biathletes at the 1964 Winter Olympics
People from Weinfelden
Sportspeople from Thurgau